The Wabasha Rail Bridge was a floating pontoon bridge which crossed the Mississippi River north of Wabasha, Minnesota, between Reads Landing, Minnesota and Trevino, Wisconsin.  The Milwaukee Road constructed the bridge in 1882, connecting the Chippewa Valley Line to the Milwaukee Road Main Line on the Minnesota side of the Mississippi River.  The bridge was similar to the Pile-Pontoon Railroad Bridge at Prairie du Chien, Wisconsin.

Replacement spans were built in 1890 and 1932.  Use of the bridge was discontinued in 1951 following a washout; the Milwaukee Road instead obtained trackage rights from Winona, Minnesota to Trevino, to continue use of the Chippewa Valley Line.

See also
List of crossings of the Upper Mississippi River

References

External links
 The Milwaukee Road's Floating Pontoon Railroad Bridge Across the Mighty Mississippi River – The Chippewa Valley Line
 Milwaukee Road Pontoon Bridge

Bridges in Minnesota
Bridges in Wisconsin
Bridges over the Mississippi River
Buildings and structures in Wabasha County, Minnesota
Buildings and structures in Buffalo County, Wisconsin
Interstate railroad bridges in the United States
Pontoon bridges in the United States